Gerald Moffatt Darvill (20 March 1916 – 1973) was an English professional footballer who played in the Football League for Mansfield Town.

References

1916 births
1973 deaths
English footballers
Association football defenders
English Football League players
Wycombe Wanderers F.C. players
Reading F.C. players
Mansfield Town F.C. players
Wolverhampton Wanderers F.C. players